Papilio chikae, the Luzon peacock swallowtail, is a species of butterfly in the family Papilionidae. It is endemic to the Philippines. It has two subspecies, with P. c. chikae from Luzon and P. c. hermeli (Nuyda, 1992) from Mindoro. The latter was originally described as a separate species, but it resembles the nominate subspecies and there are no significant differences in their genitalia, leading recent authorities to treat them as subspecies of a single species.

It is listed as endangered by the IUCN and ESA, and is included on Appendix I of CITES, thereby making commercial international trade illegal.

Description
Their forewings are black with pale blue veins, while their hind wings are black with turquoise and red edges.

References

Other reading
Erich Bauer and Thomas Frankenbach, 1998 Schmetterlinge der Erde, Butterflies of the World Part I (1), Papilionidae Papilionidae I: Papilio, Subgenus Achillides, Bhutanitis, Teinopalpus. Edited by Erich Bauer and Thomas Frankenbach. Keltern: Goecke & Evers; Canterbury: Hillside Books 

chikae
Lepidoptera of the Philippines
Butterflies described in 1819
Fauna of Luzon
Taxonomy articles created by Polbot